Tropidophis spiritus, also known commonly as the Sancti Spiritus dwarf boa and the Sancti Spiritus trope, is a small species of snake in the family Tropidophiidae (dwarf boas). The species is endemic to the province of Sancti Spíritus in central Cuba. It is distinguished from other Tropidophis species by its gracile body shape and color pattern of bold spots.

Habitat

References

Tropidophiidae
Snakes of the Caribbean
Reptiles of Cuba
Endemic fauna of Cuba
Reptiles described in 1999
Taxa named by Stephen Blair Hedges